Pietro Francesco Ferranti, also known as cavalier Ferrante (circa 1612 - 1681) was an Italian painter of the Baroque period.

Biography
He was born in Bologna. He was apparently a pupil of Giovanni Francesco Gessi. Other sources attribute him a pupil of Guido Reni. He painted a St Paul calms the Storm (1642) for the choir of San Paolo Maggiore, Bologna. A fresco depicting the Miracle of St Anthony of Padua painted under the portico of San Francesco in Bologna is attributed to Ferrante. he worked in Piacenza in 1644, where he painted some frescoed angels for the church of Santa Maria Maddalena delle Convertite, and a Virgin with Saints Carlo, Andrea, Teresa, Elizabeth, as well as a donor'' for the church of Sant'Antonino. Some sources attribute his death as early as 1653 or as late as 1676. Some sources say he died in Sicily.

References

1610s births
Year of death unknown
Painters from Bologna
17th-century Italian painters
Italian male painters
Italian Baroque painters